Omar Catarí Peraza (born April 25, 1964 in Barquisimeto, Lara) is a former Venezuelan boxer. At the 1984 Summer Olympics he won the bronze medal in the men's featherweight division (– 57 kg), along with Türgüt Aykaç of Turkey.

Olympic results 
1984 - Los Angeles
Round of 64 bye
Round of 32: Defeated Azzedine Said (Algeria) referee stopped contest in second round
Round of 16: Defeated Satoru Higashi (Japan) by decision, 4-1
Quarterfinal: Defeated Park Hyung-Ok (South Korea) by decision, 4-1
Semifinals: Lost to Meldrick Taylor (United States) by decision, 0-5 (was awarded bronze medal)

1988 - Seoul
1st round bye
Defeated Moussa Kagambega (Burkina Faso) by first-round knockout
Lost to Abdelhak Achik (Morocco) by first-round knockout

References

External links
Profile

1964 births
Living people
Featherweight boxers
Olympic boxers of Venezuela
Boxers at the 1984 Summer Olympics
Boxers at the 1988 Summer Olympics
Olympic bronze medalists for Venezuela
Sportspeople from Barquisimeto
Olympic medalists in boxing
Medalists at the 1984 Summer Olympics
Boxers at the 1983 Pan American Games
Boxers at the 1987 Pan American Games
Pan American Games competitors for Venezuela
Venezuelan male boxers
Central American and Caribbean Games bronze medalists for Venezuela
Competitors at the 1986 Central American and Caribbean Games
Central American and Caribbean Games medalists in boxing
20th-century Venezuelan people